Ottum is a surname. Notable people with the surname include:
 Josh Ottum (born 1978), American musician, songwriter, and scholar
 Robert K. Ottum (1925–1986), American sports journalist and writer